The Battle of Cloyd's Mountain was a Union victory in western Virginia on May 9, 1864, that allowed the Union forces to destroy a large bridge on the Virginia and Tennessee Railroad. The railroad was used to carry Confederate troops and supplies, and served important lead and salt mines. It also helped connect the Confederate capital of Richmond with Tennessee, and had telegraph wires along its line for communications. The fight had a high percentage of casualties for both sides, and the Confederate commander, Brigadier General Albert G. Jenkins, was mortally wounded.

Background
Brigadier General George Crook commanded the Union Army of West Virginia, made up of three brigades from the Division of the Kanawha. When Ulysses S. Grant launched his spring offensive of 1864, two Union armies marched towards Richmond and a third moved into the Shenandoah Valley. Crook's troops were also involved in the offensive and began to march through the Appalachian Mountains into southwest Virginia. His objective was to destroy the Virginia & Tennessee Railroad, working in conjunction with William W. Averell's offensive (Battle of Cove Mountain), which had similar objectives. Brig. Gen. Albert G. Jenkins was in command of the few scattered Confederate units protecting the rail lines. He had assumed command only the day before Crook's army began to approach the railroad.

Nevertheless, Jenkins was an experienced soldier. During the 1863 Gettysburg Campaign, Jenkins' Brigade had formed the cavalry screen for Richard S. Ewell's Second Corps. Jenkins led his men through the Cumberland Valley into Pennsylvania and seized Chambersburg, burning down nearby railroad structures and bridges. He accompanied Ewell's column to Carlisle, briefly skirmishing with Union militia at the Battle of Sporting Hill near Harrisburg. During the Battle of Gettysburg, Jenkins was wounded on July 2 and missed the final day's fighting. He did not recover to rejoin his command until autumn. Jenkins spent the early part of 1864 raising and organizing a large cavalry force for service in western Virginia. By May, he had been appointed Commander of the Department of Western Virginia with his headquarters at Dublin.

Battle

Jenkins, having decided to make a stand at Cloyd's Mountain, set up a strong defensive position. When Crook arrived, he decided against a frontal assault, concluding that the Confederate works were too strong and such an attack would decimate his army. The surrounding area was heavily forested and Crook used this as cover to swing his brigades around to the Confederate right flank.

Crook began the battle with an artillery barrage, then sent in his brigade of green West Virginians under Colonel Carr B. White. Crook's remaining two brigades under Colonel Horatio G. Sickel and future president Colonel Rutherford B. Hayes were to launch a frontal assault as soon as the West Virginians had gotten under way. Serving as a major under Hayes was another future U.S. President, William McKinley. White's brigade, in its first fight, advanced to within 20 yards before heavy casualties from its exposed position forced it back. Crook, moving with Hayes' Ohio brigade, had to dismount and walk the slopes on foot because they were so steep. Still wearing his jack boots, he sank in a small stream the troops were crossing and his boots filled with water. Nearby soldiers rushed back and pulled him out.

Hayes' brigade spearheaded the main assault around 11 a.m. The troops fought their way to the Confederate works and severe hand-to-hand fighting ensued. Sparks from the musket fire ignited the thick blanket of leaves on the ground, and many men from Sickel's and Hayes' brigades were pinned down and burned alive. The brigades had begun to fall back, when Crook sent two fresh regiments into Hayes' front. The West Virginians finally advanced against the artillery and overran its crew. The Ohio troops now began to overwhelm the Confederate center. Jenkins tried desperately to shift troops to the threatened areas, but he fell severely wounded and was captured. His second-in-command, John McCausland, took command and conducted a rear-guard action as he withdrew his troops.

The Battle of Cloyd's Mountain was fought on the Back Creek Farm. The farmhouse served as a hospital and as headquarters for the Union General George Crook.

Results
The battle of Cloyd's Mountain was short and involved few troops, but it contained some of the most severe and savage fighting of the war. The engagement lasted a little over an hour, with much of that being hand-to-hand combat. Casualties were high for the modest number of troops involved. Crook lost 688 men, roughly 10% of his force. The Confederates lost fewer men—538—but that totaled 23% of their total force. Jenkins died a few days after his arm was amputated. The battle is considered a Union victory because Crook drove the Confederates away from the battlefield, and was able to continue on and destroy the Virginia and Tennessee Railroad depot at Dublin, Virginia. Averell was also able to destroy several railroad bridges along the same line, severing one of the Confederacy's last vital lifelines and its only rail connection to East Tennessee. The day after the battle, the remaining Confederate troops unsuccessfully defended the large railroad bridge over the nearby New River. In the melee, a soldier who refused to take cover until Col. Hayes did so was mortally wounded. While undergoing first aid, the soldier was found to be a woman.

Order of battle

Union

Kanawha Division — Brig. Gen. George Crook
 1st Brigade — Col. Rutherford B. Hayes
 23rd Ohio Infantry — Lt. Col. James M. Comly
 36th Ohio Infantry —  Col. Hiram F. Devol
 Detachment, 34th Ohio Infantry — (attached to 36th Ohio)
 5th West Virginia Cavalry (Dismounted) — Colonel Abais A. Tomlinson
 6th West Virginia Cavalry (Dismounted)
 2nd Brigade — Col. Carr B. White
 12th Ohio Infantry — Col. Jonathan D. Hines
 91st Ohio Infantry — Col. John A. Turley
 9th West Virginia Infantry — Col. Isaac H. Duval
 14th West Virginia Infantry — Col. Daniel D. Johnson
 3rd Brigade — Col. Horatio G. Sickel
 3rd Pennsylvania Reserve Regiment — Capt. Jacob Lenhart
 4th Pennsylvania Reserve Regiment — Colonel Richard H. Woolworth (killed)
 11th West Virginia Infantry — Col. Daniel Frost
 15th West Virginia Infantry — Lt. Col. Thomas Morris
 Artillery — Capt. James R. McMillin
 1st Ohio Battery — Lieut. G.P. Kirtland
 1st Kentucky Battery — Capt. David W. Glassie

Confederate

Department of Southwestern Virginia — Brig. Gen. Albert G. Jenkins (wounded and captured); John McCausland
 4th Brigade — Col. John McCausland
 45th Virginia Infantry — Col. William H. Browne
 60th Virginia Infantry — Col. Beuhring H. Jones
 36th Virginia Infantry — Lt. Col. Thomas Smith (wounded) Maj. William E. Fife
 10th (Diamond's) Kentucky Cavalry (Dismounted) (400 men)
 45th Virginia Infantry Battalion — Lt. Col. Henry M. Beckley
 Home Guards
 Artillery — Capt. Thomas A. Bryan (wounded)
 Botetourt (Va.) Artillery — Capt. H.C. Douthat
 Bryan's (Va.) Battery — Lieut. G.A. Fowlkes
 Ringgold (Va.) Battery — Capt. Crispin Dickenson
 Morgan's Brigade — Brig. Gen. John Hunt Morgan (brigade arrived late and took part only in the retreat)
 5th Kentucky Cavalry - Col. D. Howard Smith

See also

 Valley Campaigns of 1864

References

Additional sources
 Kennedy, Frances H., editor, The Civil War Battlefield Guide: Second Edition (1998)
 National Park Service battle description
 Description of forces
 Official Report - McCausland Confederate casualties
 Official Report - Crook Union casualties

Cloyd's Mountain
Cloyd's Mountain
Cloyd's Mountain
Pulaski County, Virginia
Cloyd's Mountain
1864 in Virginia
May 1864 events